Lathropus is a genus of beetles in the family Laemophloeidae. It has been the subject of recent taxonomic study.  Lathropus species are minute (<2mm) flattened beetles with short, clubbed antennae, closed mesocoxal cavities, extremely dense surface sculpture, and dorsal pubescence composed of bifurcate setae. Currently recognized valid species are:

 Lathropus chickcharnie Thomas
 Lathropus jamaicensis Thomas
 Lathropus minimus Champion
 Lathropus parvulus Grouvelle
 Lathropus pictus Schwarz
 Lathropus pubescens Casey
 Lathropus rhabdophloeoides Thomas
 Lathropus robustulus Casey
 Lathropus sepicola (Müller in Germar)
 Lathropus striatus Casey, 1916
 Lathropus vernalis Casey

All but one of the known species of Lathropus are indigenous to the New World. The one exception, L. sepicola, is found in Europe. Adults and larvae are associated with dead trees and feed on fungi.

References

Laemophloeidae
Cucujoidea genera